Tugay Oğulay Uzan (born 27 February 1994) is a Turkish footballer who plays for VSG Altglienicke in the Regionalliga Nordost.

References

External links
 
 Tugay Uzan at eurosport.com
 Tugay Uzan at spox.com 

1994 births
Living people
Footballers from Berlin
Turkish footballers
Turkey youth international footballers
German footballers
German people of Turkish descent
FC Rot-Weiß Erfurt players
3. Liga players
Association football forwards
VSG Altglienicke players